Jussi Pesonen (born May 23, 1979) is a Finnish professional ice hockey player who currently plays for Vaasan Sport of the Liiga.

Personal
Pesonen's brother is Harri Pesonen.

References

External links

Living people
KalPa players
1979 births
Finnish ice hockey forwards

fi:Jussi Pesonen